is a national university in the city of Tokushima, Japan, with seven graduate schools and five undergraduate faculties. The university was founded in 1949, by merging six national education facilities into one. The 2014 Nobel Prize Laureate in Physics, Shuji Nakamura graduated from Tokushima University.

On April 1, 2015, the name of the university was changed from the University of Tokushima to Tokushima University.

Overview
Tokushima University was first established in 1949 as a result of a merger of six schools, forming what are now the Faculty of Integrated Arts and Sciences, Faculty of Engineering and Faculty of Medicine. The university has about 6,000 undergraduate and about 1,700 graduate students from Japan and other countries including South Korea, China, and the United States.

Organization and academics
Tokushima University is organized into seven graduate schools: School of Human and Natural Environment Sciences, School of Medical Sciences, School of Oral Sciences, School of Pharmaceutical Sciences, School of Nutrition and Bioscience, School of Health Sciences and School of Advanced Technology and Science. As for undergraduate faculties, there are Faculty of Integrated Arts and Sciences, Faculty of Medicine, Faculty of Dentistry, Faculty of Pharmaceutical Sciences and Faculty of Engineering.

One unique feature is the large number of affiliated institutes and research centers representing a wide range of interests and disciplines.

Urologist Susumu Kagawa has been the president of the university since 2010.

Campuses
Tokushima University operates on three campuses: Shinkura (with the administrative head office), Jōsanjima, and Kuramoto.

Notable alumni
Shuji Nakamura, known as the inventor of first high brightness GaN LED, awarded the 2014 Nobel Prize in Physics. Also Shigenori Maruyama a Purple Honour Medal recipient for his work related to plume tectonics.

References

External links
 Official website

Educational institutions established in 1949
Japanese national universities
University of Tokushima
1949 establishments in Japan
Kansai Collegiate American Football League
Tokushima (city)